This is a list of the 18 members of the European Parliament for Bulgaria in the 2004 to 2009 session, replacing the members who were appointed by the Bulgarian Parliament.

List

2007
List
Bulgaria